Buzz may refer to:

People
Buzz (nickname), a list of people
J. Buzz Von Ornsteiner (born 1967; aka Dr. Buzz), American forensic psychologist and journalist

Fictional characters
Buzz, a character in the 1987 American comedy movie Revenge of the Nerds II: Nerds in Paradise
Buzz Lightyear, from the Toy Story franchise
Buzz Buzzard, nemesis of Woody Woodpecker
Buzz Sawyer, professional wrestling persona of Bruce Woyan
Buzz (mascot), mascot of the Georgia Tech Yellow Jackets
Buzz, from the Donkey Kong video game series
Buzz Buzz, from the Super NES video game EarthBound
Buzz, a Neopet from an online virtual pet site
Buzz McCallister, from the Home Alone movie trilogy
Buzz, title character of Buzz! games
Buzz (Marvel Comics), a fictional character in the Spider-Girl comic book series
Buzz the fruit fly from Beat Bugs
Buzz, a character from Cyberchase
Buzz, a Reptool in the DreamWorks Animation TV series Dinotrux
Buzz, a  character in the video game Brawl Stars

Entertainment

Music
Buzz (band), a Korean pop/punk/rock band
Buzz (Alter Natives album) (1989)
Buzz (Guardian album) (1995)
Buzz (Fifteen album) (1996)
Buzz (Keller Williams album) (1996)
Buzz (Steps album) (2000)
Buzz (Autograph album) (2003)
Da Buzz, a Swedish pop music group

Other
Buzz (DC Thomson), a British comic that ran in the 1970s
Buzz (film), a 1998 Israeli film by Eli Cohen
Buzz (TV series), a Canadian comedy television series
Buzz!, a series of quiz video games
Buzz Cola, a fictional cola drink on The Simpsons

Technology
Jeskola Buzz, a modular software music studio environment
Aeroelasticity, fluid instability, or flutter
Yahoo! Buzz, a community launched by Yahoo! that publishes user-posted news stories
Google Buzz, a social update mechanism integrated into various Google products

Other uses
Buzz (Ryanair), a Polish subsidiary of Ryanair
Buzz (airline), a discount airline formerly operating in Europe
Buzz Airways, a now-defunct virtual airline, based in Branson, Missouri
Buzz (dinghy), a sailing dinghy
Salt Lake Buzz, former name of the Salt Lake Bees minor league baseball team
Marketing buzz, a term used in word of mouth marketing
Buzz (DC), a Washington, D.C. dance party

See also

Buzz cut, American name for a type of haircut in which the hair is sheared very closely to the scalp
Buzz number, letter and number combination applied to U.S. Air Force aircraft after World War II
The Buzz (disambiguation)
Buzzer (disambiguation)
Buzzin' (disambiguation)
Bzzz (disambiguation)
Buss (disambiguation)
Bus (disambiguation)